Isaac Terrazas García (born 23 January 1973) is a Mexican former professional footballer who played as a defender.

He played for Mexico national team and was a participant at the 1998 FIFA World Cup, also being in the Mexico squad that won 1999 FIFA Confederations Cup.

Career statistics

International goals

|-
| 1. || June 12, 1999 || Seoul, South Korea ||  || 1–1 || Draw || 1999 Korea Cup
|-
| 2. || July 3, 1999 || Ciudad del Este, Paraguay ||  || 1–2 || Loss || 1999 Copa América
|}

Honours
América
CONCACAF Champions' Cup: 1992

Mexico
FIFA Confederations Cup: 1999

References

1973 births
Living people
Footballers from Mexico City
Club América footballers
Irapuato F.C. footballers
Liga MX players
1997 FIFA Confederations Cup players
1998 FIFA World Cup players
1999 Copa América players
1999 FIFA Confederations Cup players
FIFA Confederations Cup-winning players
Mexico international footballers
Association football defenders
Mexican footballers